Tarator is a nut- or tahini- based sauce made with lemon juice and garlic that is found in Middle Eastern cuisine. It is different from tarator in Balkan cuisine, which is a yoghurt-based cucumber soup similar to tzatziki.

By region

Levant 
In Levantine cuisine, tarator is a sauce made from tahini, lemon juice, ground garlic, salt, and water. It is often served with falafels or beef shawarma.

Turkey 
In Turkish cuisine,  is a sauce made from walnuts, bread, lemon juice or vinegar, ground garlic, and olive oil. It is often served with fried calamari.

References 

Levantine cuisine
Sauces
Turkish cuisine